Cleveland Pinkney III (born September 14, 1977) is a former American football defensive tackle who played in the National Football League. He last played for the Detroit Lions.

Pinkney attended and played football at Sumter High School. He graduated from the University of South Carolina. He was signed as an undrafted free agent by the Tampa Bay Buccaneers and has also played for the Carolina Panthers.

External links 
Cleveland Pinkney at Buccaneers.com
Cleveland Pinkney at Fox Sports.com
Cleveland Pinkney at CBS Sportsline
Cleveland Pinkney at SI.com

1977 births
Living people
Sportspeople from Sumter, South Carolina
American football defensive tackles
Copiah-Lincoln Wolfpack football players
South Carolina Gamecocks football players
Tampa Bay Buccaneers players
Carolina Panthers players
Detroit Lions players